Stefan Nikolić may refer to:

 Stefan Nikolić (basketball, born 1987), Serbian basketball player (Bulgaria, Greece, Germany, France, Romania, Slovenia)
 Stefan Nikolić (footballer, born 1990), Montenegrin footballer
 Stefan Nikolić (footballer, born 1994), Serbian footballer
 Stefan Nikolić (basketball, born 1997), Serbian basketball player (Virtus Bologna)
 Stefan Nikolić (rugby league), member of the Serbia national rugby league team